Gordeh (also known as Ardāl, Qal‘eh Gerdeh, and Qal’eh-ye Gordeh) is a village in Runiz Rural District, Runiz District, Estahban County, Fars Province, Iran. At the 2006 census, its population was 1,748, in 414 families.

References 

Populated places in Estahban County